Akçakese (literally "quite white shortcut") is a Turkish place name that may refer to the following places in Turkey:

 Akçakese, Ağlı, a village in Ağlı
 Akçakese, Güdül, a village in the district of Güdül, Ankara Province
 Akçakese, Kastamonu, a village in the district of Kastamonu, Kastamonu Province
 Akçakese, Taşköprü, a village